Controversy is the debut studio album by American rapper Willie Dee.

Singles
"Do It Like a G.O." features Willie D, Prince Johnny C, and Sire Jukebox.  The song was also released on the Geto Boys album Grip It! On That Other Level, redone with Willie D, Scarface, and Bushwick Bill.

Critical reception
Trouser Press called the album "tedious" and "filled with dull misogynist rants."

Track listing

Charts

Weekly charts

Personnel
Credits are adapted from AllMusic.

 Clifford Blodget - Mixing
 Willie D - Composer, Performer, Primary Artist, Vocals
 DJ Ready Red - Producer
 Doug King - Engineer, Producer
 Prince Johnny C - Producer

References

External links
Discogs entry

1989 debut albums
Willie D albums
Rap-A-Lot Records albums